The 1916 Missouri gubernatorial election was held on November 7, 1916 and resulted in a narrow victory for the Democratic nominee, St. Louis businessman Frederick D. Gardner, over the Republican candidate, Chief Justice of the Supreme Court of Missouri Henry Lamm, and candidates representing the Socialist, Progressive, Prohibition, and Socialist Labor parties. To date it is the closest gubernatorial election in Missouri history. Gardner defeated Secretary of State Cornelius Roach, Attorney General John Tull Barker, and lieutenant governor William Rock Painter for his party's nomination.

Results

References

Missouri
1916
Gubernatorial
November 1916 events